The Rafael Balseiro Maceira School, is located in the town of Barceloneta, Puerto Rico. The school is a reinforced concrete building with two levels, eclectic style, with L-shaped floors. It was completed in 1921. The eight-room building was designed by Adrian C. Finlayson, one of the most prolific architects of the period, and built by local contractor engineer Antonio M. Navas. The property was listed on the National Register of Historic Places on August 28, 2012.

Gallery

References

School buildings on the National Register of Historic Places in Puerto Rico
Barceloneta, Puerto Rico
1921 establishments in Puerto Rico
School buildings completed in 1921
Late 19th and Early 20th Century American Movements architecture
Prairie School architecture